Marnoo is a town in the Wimmera region of Victoria, Australia. Its postal code is 3387.

References

Towns in Victoria (Australia)